Presciano is a village in Tuscany, central Italy, in the comune of Siena, province of Siena. At the time of the 2001 census its population was 60.

Presciano is about 12 km from Siena.

Gallery

References 

Frazioni of Siena